Liina Suurvarik (born 16 October 1980) is an Estonian former professional tennis player.

Suurvarik has career-high WTA rankings of 576 in singles, achieved on 4 October 1999, and 351 in doubles, set on 4 October 1999. Playing for Estonia at the Fed Cup, Laupa has a win–loss record of 18–13.

Born and raised in Tallinn, Suurvarik studied at Illinois State University in the United States. Where she played tennis on the college team of the university. She played tennis on the Illinois State Redbirds college team.

ITF Circuit finals

Doubles: 2 (0–2)

References

External links
 
 
 

1980 births
Living people
Estonian female tennis players
Sportspeople from Tallinn
Illinois State Redbirds women's tennis players
Estonian expatriate sportspeople in the United States